Link 16 is a military tactical data link network used by NATO and nations allowed by the MIDS International Program Office (IPO).  Its specification is part of the family of Tactical Data Links.

With Link 16, military aircraft as well as ships and ground forces may exchange their tactical picture in near-real time. Link 16 also supports the exchange of text messages, imagery data and provides two channels of digital voice (2.4 kbit/s or 16 kbit/s in any combination).  Link 16 is defined as one of the digital services of the JTIDS / MIDS in NATO's Standardization Agreement STANAG 5516. MIL-STD-6016 is the related United States Department of Defense Link 16 MIL-STD.

Technical characteristics 

Link 16 is a TDMA-based secure, jam-resistant, high-speed digital data link which operates in the radio frequency band 960–1,215 MHz, allocated in line with the International Telecommunication Union (ITU) Radio regulations to the aeronautical radionavigation service and to the radionavigation satellite service. This frequency range limits the exchange of information to users within line-of-sight of one another, although with satellite capabilities and adhoc protocols, it is nowadays possible to pass Link 16 data over long-haul protocols such as TCP/IP using MIL-STD 3011 (JREAP) or STANAG 5602 (SIMPLE). It uses the transmission characteristics and protocols, conventions, and fixed-length or variable length message formats defined by MIL-STD 6016 and STANAG 5516 (formerly the JTIDS technical interface design plan). Information is typically passed at one of three data rates: 31.6, 57.6, or 115.2 kilobits per second (kbits/s), although the radios and frequency-hopping spread spectrum (FHSS) waveform itself can support throughput values well over 1 Mbit/s.

Link 16 information is primarily coded in J.-series messages which are binary data words with well-defined meanings. These data words are grouped in functional areas, and allocated to network participation groups (NPG) (virtual networks), most importantly:
 PPLI, or Precise Participant Location and Identification (network participation groups 5 and 6),
 Surveillance (network participation group 7),
 Command (Mission Management/Weapons Coordination) (network participation group 8),
 (Aircraft) Control (network participation group 9),
 Electronic Warfare & Coordination (network participation group 10).

Development 
Link 16 is intended to advance Tactical Data Links (TDLs) as the NATO standard for data link information exchange. Link 16 equipment is located in ground, airborne, and sea-based air defense platforms and selected fighter aircraft. The U.S. industry is now developing a new Link 16 SCA compliant radio MIDS-JTRS which currently is projected to implement nine various tactical waveforms, including Link 16.

The MIDS program, which manage the development of the communication component for Link 16, is managed by the International Program Office located in San Diego, California. In the United States, the lead Air Force command for the MIL-STD-6016 standard, plans, and requirements is the Air Force Global Cyberspace Integration Center at Langley AFB, with JTIDS program execution managed by the 653d Electronic Systems Wing at Hanscom Air Force Base near Boston, Massachusetts. The MIL-STD-6016 Standard configuration management custodian is the Defense Information Systems Agency.

Platforms 
Some examples of platforms currently using the Link 16 capability are:

Aircraft 

 AH-64E Apache
 ATR 72MP
 B-1B Lancer
 B-2 Spirit
 C-130J
 E-2C Hawkeye
 E-3 Sentry
 E-7A Wedgetail
 E-8 Joint STARS
 EA-6B Prowler
 EA-18G Growler
 EP-3E
 Embraer C-390 Millennium
 F-15 Eagle
 F-16 Fighting Falcon
 F/A-18 Hornet
 F/A-18 Super Hornet
 F-22 Raptor
 F-35 Lightning II
 JAS 39 Gripen
 KC30A-MRTT
 KC-46
 MH-60S/R Seahawk
 HH-60W
 Mirage 2000D
 Mirage 2000
 P-3C Orion
 P-8A Poseidon
 Rafale 
 R-99
 RC-135 Rivet Joint
 S 100B Argus
 Sea King Mk 7 ASaC
 Tornado
 Typhoon

Ships 
 U.S. carrier battle groups
 French aircraft carrier Charles de Gaulle (R91)
 Italian aircraft carrier Cavour (550) and Giuseppe Garibaldi (551)
 Royal Navy ships, Canadian, Australian, French, Italian, Spanish, Danish, Norwegian, Netherlands, New Zealand and German frigates
 German K130 Braunschweig-class corvette
 Swedish Visby-class corvette
 Finnish Hämeenmaa-class minelayer 
 Japan Maritime Self-Defense Force Akizuki-class
 Republic of Korea Navy Sejong the Great-class
 Taiwanese Kee Lung Class Destroyers
 Japan MSDF Kongō-class destroyer

 MILGEM project class

Ground vehicles 
 VESTA (Verifiëren, Evalueren, Simuleren, Trainen en Analyseren), a minivan with radiotower used for training purposes

Missile defense systems 
 Arrow
 SAMP/T
 Patriot ICC and Battery Command Post (BCP)
 THAAD
 JTAGS
 NASAMS
 Joint Land Attack/Cruise Missile Defense Elevated Netted Sensors (JLENS)

Networked weapons 
 SDB II
 JSOW-C1

Command and control 
 Joint Data Network

The U.S. Army is integrating Link 16 into select command and control elements of its UH-60 Black Hawk fleet, and intends to pursue fielding to AH-64 Apache and other aviation assets.

The USAF will add Link 16 to its Rockwell B-1 Lancer and Boeing B-52 Stratofortress bombers with the Common Link Integration Processing system. A key exception is the Lockheed Martin F-22 Raptor which can only receive but not transmit Link 16 data. According to the Air Force, transmitting data would reveal its location. Upgrades to the F-22 has since given it the ability to transmit Link 16 as well.

See also 
 Network simulator for simulation of military radios and tactical data links
 Air Force Command and Control Integration Center lead Air Force command for MIL-STD-6016 standard and plans/programs
 653d Electronic Systems Wing JTIDS program execution
 JREAP Joint Range Extension Applications Protocol

References

Notes

General references 

 TADIL J guide
 USAF GCIC Homepage
 653rd Electronic Systems Wing Homepage

Military radio systems